Manjari is a village located in Chikodi Tehsil of Belgaum district in Karnataka, India. As per 2009 stats, Manjari village is also a gram panchayat. 
Manjari has a total population of 8,613 peoples. There are about 1,844 houses in Manjari village.

References 

Villages in Belagavi district